The year 2014 in architecture involved some significant architectural events and new buildings.

Events
 June 8–November 23 – Venice Biennale of Architecture curated by Rem Koolhaas
 October 1–3 – The seventh World Architecture Festival in Singapore
 November 4 – Construction of Santiago Calatrava's Chicago Spire is abandoned

Buildings and structures

Antarctica
 February 12 – Jang Bogo Station opens.

Australia
 date unknown – Infinity Tower, the tallest building in Brisbane, is completed (until 2016).
 November 11 – Dr Chau Chak Wing Building, University of Technology, Sydney, designed by Frank Gehry, is completed.

Canada
 September 18 – Aga Khan Museum in Toronto, opens.
 September 19 – Canadian Museum for Human Rights in Winnipeg, Manitoba, designed by Antoine Predock, opens.
 December 13 – Halifax Central Library in Halifax, Nova Scotia, designed by Fowler Bauld and schmidt hammer lassen architects, opens.

France

 October 28 – Louis Vuitton Foundation in Paris, designed by Frank Gehry, opens.

Germany
 February – Taunusturm in Frankfurt opens.

Iran
 October – Tabiat Bridge in Tehran, designed by Leila Araghian, opens.

Italy
 October 17 – Bosco Verticale in Milan, by Stefano Boeri opens.

Latvia
 August 29 – New National Library of Latvia building in Riga, designed by Gunnar Birkerts, opens.

Panama
 October 2 – Biomuseo in Panama City, designed by Frank Gehry, opens.

Philippines
 July 21 – Philippine Arena, the world's largest indoor domed-arena, in Ciudad de Victoria, Bocaue and Santa Maria, Bulacan, is completed.

Poland
 Szczecin Philharmonic Hall, by Barozzi Veiga, is completed.

Romania
 Summer – The Maryam Mosque, a mosque for Romanian converts to Islam in Rediu, is completed.

Taiwan
 November 23 – National Taichung Theater, by Toyo Ito with Cecil Balmond, is opened.

United Arab Emirates
 Dream Dubai Marina, supertall skyscraper in Dubai, projected for completion. If completed before World One will become the tallest residential building in the world upon completion.

United Kingdom
 July – Buildings in London designed by Rogers Stirk Harbour + Partners completed:
 122 Leadenhall Street in the City.
 World Conservation and Exhibitions Centre, British Museum.
 August – 20 Fenchurch Street in the City of London, designed by Rafael Viñoly, completed.
 September 16 – The News Building (London), designed by Renzo Piano, officially opened and named.
 September 29 – Weston Library, a major reconstruction of the University of Oxford's New Bodleian Library by WilkinsonEyre, opens to readers.
 December 9 – University of Greenwich Stockwell Street Building, designed by heneghan peng architects (hparc), opened.
 London School of Economics Saw Swee Hock Student Centre, designed by O'Donnell & Tuomey.
 Burntwood School, Wandsworth, London, designed by Allford Hall Monaghan Morris, completed; awarded 2015 Stirling Prize.
 Everyman Theatre, Liverpool, designed by Haworth Tompkins, completed and awarded Stirling Prize.
 Maggie's palliative care centres opened in
 Lanarkshire, designed by Reiach and Hall (September).
 Oxford, designed by Wilkinson Eyre Architects (October).

United States
 October 1 — Bill & Melinda Gates Hall at Cornell University is dedicated, designed by Thom Mayne of Morphosis Architects.
 October 9 – Windhover Contemplative Center, designed by Aidlin Darling Design, opens at Stanford University.
 October 10 – 432 Park Avenue, the tallest residential buildings in the world is topped out.
 November 3 – One World Trade Center in New York City, designed by David Childs of Skidmore, Owings & Merrill with Daniel Libeskind, the tallest building in the Western Hemisphere, opens.
 One57, one of the tallest buildings in New York City became the tallest mixed-use (residential and hotel) skyscraper in the city.

Exhibitions
October 25 until February 22, 2015 - Diller & Scofidio + Renfro Musings on a Glass Box at Fondation Cartier pour l'Art Contemporain in Paris, France.
 December 3 (ends May 2015) – "One Way: Peter Marino" at the Bass Museum in Miami Beach, Florida.

Awards
 AIA Architecture Firm Award – Eskew+Dumez+Ripple
 AIA Gold Medal – Julia Morgan
 Emporis Skyscraper Award – Wangjing SOHO designed by Zaha Hadid
 Driehaus Architecture Prize for New Classical architecture – Pier Carlo Bontempi
 Lawrence Israel Prize – LOT-EK
 LEAF Award, Overall Winner – Ateliers Jean Nouvel and PTW Architects
 Praemium Imperiale Architecture Laureate – Steven Holl
 Pritzker Architecture Prize – Shigeru Ban
 Reed Award for classical architecture commitment – Ruan Yisan
 RAIA Gold Medal – Phil Harris and Adrian Welke
 RIBA Royal Gold Medal – Joseph Rykwert
 Stirling Prize – Haworth Tompkins for Everyman Theatre, Liverpool
 Thomas Jefferson Medal in Architecture – Toyo Ito
 Twenty-five Year Award by AIA – Harry Weese for Washington Metro
 UIA Gold Medal – Ieoh Ming Pei
 Vincent Scully Prize from National Building Museum – Charlie Rose

Deaths
 January 10 – Kathryn Findlay, British-born architect working in Japan (b. 1953)
 February 25 – Heikki Siren, Finnish architect (b. 1918)
 March 20 – William Toomath, (b. 1925), New Zealand architect
 March 28
 Robin Gibson, Australian architect (b. 1930)
 Avraham Yaski, Romanian-born Israeli architect and academic (b. 1927)
 April 24 – Hans Hollein, Austrian architect (b. 1934)
 April 28 – Frederic Schwartz, American architect, author and city planner (b. 1951)
 July 11 – Randall Stout, 56, American architect (b. 1958)
 July 26 – Sir Richard MacCormac, British architect (b. 1938)
 August 18 – Kurt Meyer, Swiss-born architect working in the United States and Nepal (b. 1922)
 August 22 – Sir Philip Dowson, British architect (b. 1924)
 September 6 – Édith Girard, French architect (b. 1949)
 September 27 
Taylor Hardwick, American architect (b. 1925)
Antti Lovag, Hungarian architect (Palais Bulles) (b. 1920)
 December 24 – Ricardo Porro, Cuban architect who worked in France (b. 1925)

See also
Timeline of architecture

References

 
21st-century architecture